Saint-Malo-de-Beignon (literally Saint-Malo of Beignon) is a commune in the Morbihan department of Brittany in north-western France. Inhabitants of Saint-Malo-de-Beignon are called in French Maloins.

See also
Communes of the Morbihan department

References

External links

 Mayors of Morbihan Association 

Saintmalodebeignon